Bozian Racing is a French auto racing team founded in 1969 by Arthur Bozian. Although it also run in circuits, the rally represents the principal activity of the team. It was related to Renault for a long time. In 2002, Bozian Racing became the satellite team of Peugeot Sport, while engagement in particular, on several rallies of the WRC, running names such as Gilles Panizzi, Harri Rovanperä and Cédric Robert. In 2006 Bozian Racing took, to some extent, the relay of Peugeot Sport, which was withdrawn from the WRC at the end of the 2005 season, by engaging two Peugeot 307 WRCs in the Manufacturer 2 championship, running with the Austrian Manfred Stohl and the Norwegian Henning Solberg under the name of OMV Peugeot Norway.

WRC Results

References

French auto racing teams
World Rally Championship teams
Auto racing teams established in 1969